The 1844 United States presidential election in Delaware took place between November 1 and December 4, 1844, as part of the 1844 United States presidential election. Voters chose three representatives, or electors to the Electoral College, who voted for President and Vice President.

Delaware voted for the Whig candidate, Henry Clay, over Democratic candidate James K. Polk. Clay won the state by a narrow margin of 2.45%.

Results

See also
 United States presidential elections in Delaware

References

Delaware
1844
1844 Delaware elections